Mario Losada may refer to:

 Mario Losada (politician) (1938–2015), Argentine politician
 Mario Losada (footballer) (born 1997), Spanish footballer